Scaliola caledonica is a species of sea snail, a marine gastropod mollusk in the family Scaliolidae.

Description

Distribution

References

Scaliolidae
Gastropods described in 1870